Famous or notable Bulgarian sportspeople include:

Athletics
Yordanka Blagoeva - Olympic silver and bronze medalist
 Rostislav Dimitrov
Svetla Dimitrova
 Yordanka Donkova - Olympic gold and bronze medalist
Ivanka Khristova - Olympic gold and bronze medalist 
Tsvetanka Khristova - Olympic silver and bronze medalist
 Stefka Kostadinova - Olympic gold and bronze medalist
 Ivet Lalova - European Champion
 Tereza Marinova - Olympic gold medalist 
Khristo Markov - Olympic gold medalist
Svetla Mitkova
 Petya Pendareva
Mariya Petkova - Double Olympic silver medalist
Petar Petrov - Olympic bronze medalist
 Iva Prandzheva
Nikolina Shtereva - Olympic silver medalist
Vasilka Stoeva - Olympic bronze medalist
Atanas Tarev
Daniela Yordanova
Diana Yorgova - Olympic silver medalist
Ginka Zagorcheva

Badminton
Petya Nedelcheva
Linda Zechiri

Basketball

Denis Agre
Krasimira Bogdanova
Diana Braynova-Dilova
Vanya Dermendzhieva
Silviya Germanova
Nadka Golcheva
Krasimira Gyurova
Kosta Iliev
Petkana Makaveeva
Penka Metodieva
Angelina Mikhaylova
Snezhana Mikhaylova
Kostadinka Radkova
Margarita Shtarkelova
Gergina Skerlatova
Evladiya Slavcheva-Stefanova
Mariya Stoyanova
Penka Stoyanova
Todorka Yordanova

Biathlon
 Krasimir Anev
 Ekaterina Dafovska - Olympic gold medalist
 Pavlina Filipova
 Vladimir Iliev
 Irina Nikulchina - Olympic bronze medalist

Boxing
Angel Angelov - Olympic silver medalist
Boris Georgiev - Olympic bronze medalist
Aleksandar Khristov - Olympic silver medalist
Vladimir Kolev - Olympic bronze medalist
Georgi Kostadinov - Olympic gold medalist
Petar Lesov - Olympic gold medalist
Ivailo Marinov - Olympic gold and bronze medalist
Ivan Mihailov - Olympic bronze medalist
Alexander Nikolov - Olympic bronze medalist
Boris Nikolov - Olympic bronze medalist
Daniel Petrov - Olympic gold and silver medalist
Tervel Pulev - Olympic bronze medalist
Svilen Rusinov - Olympic bronze medalist
Georgi Stankov - Olympic bronze medalist
Serafim Todorov - Olympic silver medalist
Tontcho Tontchev - Olympic silver medalist

Canoeing
Borislav Ananiev - Olympic bronze medalist
Borislav Borisov - Olympic bronze medalist
Nikolay Bukhalov - Double Olympic gold medalist
Ivan Burtchin - Olympic bronze medalist
Fedia Damianov - Olympic bronze medalist
Andrian Dushev - Olympic bronze medalist
Vanja Gesheva-Tsvetkova - Olympic gold, double silver and bronze medalist
Nikolai Ilkov - Olympic bronze medalist
Borislava Ivanova - Olympic bronze medalist
Milko Kazanov - Olympic bronze medalist
Lazar Khristov - Olympic bronze medalist
Lyubomir Lyubenov - Olympic gold and silver medalist
Ivan Manev - Olympic bronze medalist
Martin Marinov - Double Olympic bronze medalist
Petar Merkov - Double Olympic silver medalist
Bozhidar Milenkov - Olympic bronze medalist
Diana Paliiska - Olympic silver and bronze medalist
Ognyana Petrova - Olympic bronze medalist
Blagovest Stoyanov - Olympic bronze medalist

Cross-country skiing
 Ivan Lebanov - Olympic bronze medalist

Equestrian
Petar Mandajiev - Olympic silver medalist

Fencing
Vasil Etropolski - World Champion

Figure skating
Albena Denkova
Maxim Staviski

Football

Dimitar Berbatov
Boris Boyanchev
Lachezar Dafkov
Mario Danailov
Georgi Danov
Zdravko Dermenov
Stanimir Dimitrov
Emil Donchev
Nikolay Godzhev
Georgi Gradev
Stoyan Grigorov
Stefani Iotova
Krastina Ivanova
Milan Karatantchev
Kaloyan Kopchev
Miroslav Kosev
Aneliya Kukunova
Blagomir Mastagarkov
Aleksandar Mitushev
Yonko Nedelchev
Lyubomir Nyagolov
Boris Papazov
Genko Papazov
Hristo Petev
Dimitar Ralchev
Tsvetelin Ralchovski
Raycho Raychev
Svetoslav Sakadzhiyski
Samir Seliminski
Aleksandar Shalamanov
Shaban Shefket
Veselin Shulev
Hristo Stoichkov
Simona Stoyanova
Archontis Stoyianov
Ivana Taneva
Stelian Trasborg
Dimitar Tsenovski
Yuksel Yumerov

Gymnastics
 Stoyan Deltchev - Olympic gold and bronze medalist
 Diana Dudeva - Olympic bronze medalist
 Adriana Dunavska - Olympic silver medalist
 Lubomir Geraskov - Olympic gold medalist
 Maria Gigova - Multiple World Champion
 Diliana Gueorguieva
 Lilia Ignatova
 Zhaneta Ilieva - Olympic bronze medalist
 Velik Kapsazov - Olympic bronze medalist
 Eleonora Kezhova - Olympic bronze medalist
 Elizabeth Koleva
 Mila Marinova
 Zornitsa Marinova - Olympic bronze medalist
 Sylvia Miteva
 Elizabeth Paisieva
 Bianka Panova
 Simona Peycheva
 Diana Popova
 Iliana Raeva
 Anelia Ralenkova
 Kristina Rangelova - Olympic bronze medalist
 Neshka Robeva
 Boriana Stoyanova - World Champion
 Ivelina Taleva - Olympic silver medalist
 Galina Tancheva - Olympic bronze medalist
 Vladislava Tancheva - Olympic bronze medalist
 Julia Trashlieva
 Yordan Yovchev - Olympic silver, triple olympic bronze medalist

Martial arts
 Tsvetana Bozhilova - judoka
 Georgi Georgiev - Olympic bronze medalist judoka
 Alexandar Komanov - karateka and mixed martial arts fighter
 Iliyan Nedkov - Olympic bronze medalist judoka
 Stanoy Tabakov - sambo and mixed martial arts fighter
 Dimitar Zapryanov - Olympic silver medalist judoka

Rowing
Anka Bakova - Olympic bronze medalist
Lalka Berberova - Olympic silver medalist
Rumelyana Boncheva - Olympic bronze medalist
Bogdan Dobrev - Olympic bronze medalist
Nadiya Filipova - Olympic silver medalist
Anka Georgieva - Olympic bronze medalist
Kapka Georgieva - Olympic silver medalist
Magdalena Georgieva - Olympic bronze medalist
Ginka Gyurova - Double Olympic silver medalist
Siyka Kelbecheva - Olympic gold and bronze medalist
Stoyanka Kurbatova - Olympic gold and bronze medalist
Stefka Madina - Olympic bronze medalist
Mariyka Modeva - Double Olympic silver medalist
Dolores Nakova - Olympic bronze medalist
Rumyana Neykova - Olympic gold, silver and bronze medalist
Mincho Nikolov - Olympic bronze medalist
Violeta Ninova - Olympic bronze medalist
Svetla Otsetova - Olympic gold medalist
Lyubomir Petrov - Olympic bronze medalist
Ivo Rusev - Olympic bronze medalist
Mariana Serbezova - Olympic bronze medalist
Radka Stoyanova - Olympic silver medalist
Rita Todorova - Olympic silver medalist
Lilyana Vaseva - Olympic silver medalist
Iskra Velinova - Olympic silver medalist
Ivo Yanakiev - Olympic bronze medalist
Reni Yordanova - Olympic silver medalist
Zdravka Yordanova - Olympic gold medalist

Shooting
 Lyubcho Dyakov - Olympic bronze medalist
 Maria Grozdeva - Double Olympic gold, triple Olympic bronze medalist
 Tanyu Kiryakov - Double Olympic gold medalist
 Vesela Letcheva - Double Olympic silver medalist
 Nonka Matova - Olympic silver medalist
 Emil Milev - Olympic silver medalist

Skiing 
 Kilian Albrecht - alpine skiing
 Marina Georgieva-Nikolova - Short track speed skiing
 Petar Popangelov - alpine skiing
 Evgenia Radanova - Double Olympic silver and Olympic bronze medalist in short track speed skiing
 Kiril Trayanov - alpine skiing and vert skating
 Vladimir Zografski - World junior champion in ski jumping

Snowboarding
Aleksandra Zhekova

Swimming
Mihail Alexandrov
Tanya Dangalakova - Olympic gold medalist
Antoaneta Frenkeva - Olympic silver and bronze medalist
Bistra Gospodinova
Denislav Kalchev
Ivanka Moralieva
Petar Stoychev - World Champion in open water swimming

Table tennis
Daniela Guergueltcheva - European Champion

Tennis
 Grigor Dimitrov
 Sesil Karatantcheva
 Katerina Maleeva
 Magdalena Maleeva
 Manuela Maleeva
 Tsvetana Pironkova

Volleyball
Todor Aleksiev
Yordan Angelov - Olympic silver medalist
Verka Borisova - Olympic bronze medalist
Tsvetana Bozhurina - Olympic bronze medalist
Dimitar Dimitrov - Olympic silver medalist
Stefan Dimitrov - Olympic silver medalist
Rositsa Dimitrova - Olympic bronze medalist
Tanya Dimitrova - Olympic bronze medalist
Maya Georgieva - Olympic bronze medalist
Margarita Gerasimova - Olympic bronze medalist
Tanya Gogova - Olympic bronze medalist
Stoyan Gunchev - Olympic silver medalist
Hristo Iliev - Olympic silver medalist
Valentina Ilieva - Olympic bronze medalist
Rumyana Kaisheva - Olympic bronze medalist
Matey Kaziyski
Anka Khristolova - Olympic bronze medalist
Petko Petkov - Olympic silver medalist
Kristiana Petlichka
Silviya Petrunova - Olympic bronze medalist
Dobriana Rabadzhieva
Teodor Salparov
Kaspar Simeonov - Olympic silver medalist
Tsvetan Sokolov
Vanya Sokolova
Galina Stancheva - Olympic bronze medalist
Hristo Stoyanov - Olympic silver medalist
Radostin Stoychev
Mitko Todorov - Olympic silver medalist
Tsano Tsanov - Olympic silver medalist
Hristo Tsvetanov
Emil Valtchev - Olympic silver medalist
Antonina Zetova
Dimitar Zlatanov - Olympic silver medalist

Weightlifting
Yordan Bikov - Olympic gold medalist
Blagoy Blagoev - Olympic silver medalist
Galabin Boevski - Olympic gold medalist
Stefan Botev - Double olympic bronze medalist
Velichko Cholakov - Olympic bronze medalist
Milen Dobrev - Olympic gold medalist
Borislav Gidikov - Olympic gold medalist
Valentin Hristov - Olympic silver medalist
Ivan Ivanov - Olympic gold medalist
Nedelcho Kolev - Olympic bronze medalist
Aleksandar Kraychev - Olympic silver medalist
Mladen Kuchev - Olympic silver medalist
Sevdalin Marinov - Olympic gold medalist
Georgi Markov - Olympic silver medalist
Sevdalin Minchev - Olympic bronze medalist
Yordan Mitkov - Olympic gold medalist
Andon Nikolov - Olympic gold medalist
Norair Nurikyan - Double Olympic gold medalist
Nikolay Peshalov - Olympic gold, silver, double bronze medalist
Yanko Rusev - Olympic gold medalist
Krastyu Semerdzhiev - Olympic silver medalist
Atanas Shopov - Olympic silver and bronze medalist
Trendafil Stoychev - Olympic silver medalist
Georgi Todorov - Olympic silver medalist
Stefan Topurov - Olympic silver medalist
Alan Tsagaev - Olympic silver medalist
Aleksandar Varbanov - Olympic bronze medalist
Valentin Yordanov - Olympic gold and bronze medalist
Yoto Yotov - Double Olympic silver medalist
Asen Zlatev - Olympic gold medalist

Wrestling
Ismail Abilov - Olympic gold medalist
Lyutvi Ahmedov - Olympic silver medalist
Ivo Angelov - World champion
Stefan Angelov - Double Olympic bronze medalist
Stoyan Apostolov - Olympic silver medalist
Stoyan Balov - Olympic silver medalist
Serafim Barzakov - Olympic silver medalist
Krali Bimbalov - Olympic silver medalist
Slavcho Chervenkov - Olympic silver medalist
Dimitar Dobrev - Olympic gold and silver medalist
Vladimir Dubov - World silver medalist
Miho Dukov - Olympic silver medalist
Osman Duraliev - Olympic silver medalist
Prodan Gardzhev - Olympic gold and bronze medalist
Rangel Gerovski - Olympic silver medalist
Valentin Getsov - Olympic silver medalist
Kamen Goranov - Olympic silver medalist
Hasan Isaev - Olympic gold medalist
Angel Kerezov - Olympic silver medalist
Petar Kirov - Double Olympic gold medalist
Ivan Kolev - Olympic bronze medalist
Stancho Kolev - Double Olympic silver medalist
Atanas Komchev - Olympic gold medalist
Dimo Kostov - Olympic bronze medalist
Georgi Markov - Olympic gold medalist
Hussein Mehmedov - Olympic silver medalist
Mladen Mladenov - Olympic bronze medalist
Said Mustafov - Olympic bronze medalist
Armen Nazaryan - Double Olympic gold medalist
Ognyan Nikolov - Olympic silver medalist
Stoyan Nikolov - Olympic silver medalist
Pavel Pavlov - Olympic bronze medalist
Dinko Petrov - Olympic bronze medalist
Kiril Petkov - Olympic silver medalist
Boyan Radev - Double Olympic gold medalist
Valentin Raychev - Olympic gold medalist
Georgi Raykov - Olympic gold medalist
Alexander Rusev - Professional wrestler
Nermedin Selimov - Olympic bronze medalist
Simeon Shterev - Olympic bronze medalist
Petko Sirakov - Olympic silver medalist
Nikola Stanchev - Olympic gold medalist
Rahmat Sukra - Olympic bronze medalist
 Kiril Terziev - Olympic bronze medalist
Enyu Todorov - Olympic silver medalist
Aleksandar Tomov - Triple Olympic silver medalist
Bratan Tsenov - Olympic bronze medalist
Ivan Tsonov - Olympic silver medalist
Enyu Valchev - Olympic gold, silver and bronze medalist
Zhivko Vangelov - Olympic silver medalist
 Radoslav Velikov - Olympic bronze medalist
 Yavor Yanakiev - Olympic bronze medalist
Ivan Yankov - Olympic silver medalist
Valentin Yordanov - Olympic gold and bronze medalist
Taybe Yusein - Double World silver medalist
Nejdet Zalev - Olympic silver medalist
 Stanka Zlateva - Double Olympic silver medalist

See also

 List of Bulgarians
 List of flag bearers for Bulgaria at the Olympics
 List of Olympic men's ice hockey players for Bulgaria
 List of Olympic female gymnasts for Bulgaria

References

Sportspeople
 
Bulgarian
Lists